Gísli Þorsteinsson (born 3 August 1952) is an Icelandic judoka. He competed in the men's half-heavyweight event at the 1976 Summer Olympics.

References

1952 births
Living people
Gísli Thorsteinsson
Gísli Thorsteinsson
Judoka at the 1976 Summer Olympics
Place of birth missing (living people)